Pseudoscourfieldiales is an order of green algae in the class Pyramimonadophyceae.

References

External links

Chlorophyta orders
Pyramimonadophyceae
Monotypic orders